The following poll makes up the 1978 NCAA Division I baseball rankings.  Collegiate Baseball Newspaper published its first human poll of the top 20 teams in college baseball in 1957, and expanded to rank the top 30 teams in 1961.

Collegiate Baseball
Currently, only the final poll from the 1978 season is available.

References

 
College baseball rankings in the United States